Nicholson's pipit (Anthus nicholsoni) is a small passerine bird belonging to the pipit genus Anthus in the family Motacillidae. It was formerly included with the long-billed pipit (Anthus similis) but is now frequently treated as a separate species. It is a bird found in southern Africa. They are non-migratory.

References

Nicholson's pipit
Birds of Southern Africa
Nicholson's pipit
Nicholson's pipit